The twenty-eighth Connecticut House of Representatives district elects one member of the Connecticut House of Representatives. Its current representative is Amy Morrin Bello. The district consists of most of the town of Wethersfield, which is divided between the 28th assembly district and the 29th assembly district.

List of representatives

Recent elections

External links 
 Google Maps - Connecticut House Districts

References

28
Wethersfield, Connecticut